Sakhteman-e Qanbari (also Romanized as Sākhtemān-e Qanbarī) is a village in Fasarud Rural District, in the Central District of Darab County, Fars Province, Iran. At the 2006 census, its population was 713, in 149 families.

References 

Populated places in Darab County